Ivo Jan (born April 10, 1942 in Jesenice, Yugoslavia) is a retired Slovenian professional ice hockey player. He played for HK Acroni Jesenice in the Yugoslav Ice Hockey League. Jan played for the Yugoslavia national ice hockey team at the IIHF World Championships, and the Winter Olympics in 1964, 1968, and 1972.

His son Ivo Jan was also an ice hockey player and since 2018 is a head coach of Slovenia national team.

References

1942 births
Living people
HK Acroni Jesenice players
Ice hockey players at the 1964 Winter Olympics
Ice hockey players at the 1968 Winter Olympics
Ice hockey players at the 1972 Winter Olympics
Olympic ice hockey players of Yugoslavia
Sportspeople from Jesenice, Jesenice
Slovenia men's national ice hockey team coaches
Slovenian ice hockey defencemen
Yugoslav ice hockey defencemen